The Birch–Murnaghan isothermal equation of state, published in 1947 by Albert Francis Birch of Harvard, is a relationship between the volume of a body and the pressure to which it is subjected. Birch proposed this equation based on the work of Francis Dominic Murnaghan of Johns Hopkins University published in 1944, so that the equation is named in honor of both scientists.

Expressions for the equation of state 
The third-order Birch–Murnaghan isothermal equation of state is given by

where P is the pressure, V0 is the reference volume, V is the deformed volume, B0 is the bulk modulus, and B0' is the derivative of the bulk modulus with respect to pressure.  The bulk modulus and its derivative are usually obtained from fits to experimental data and are defined as

and

The expression for the equation of state is obtained by expanding the free energy f in the form of a series:

The internal energy, is found by integration of the pressure:

See also
Albert Francis Birch
Francis Dominic Murnaghan
Murnaghan equation of state

References 

 
 

Continuum mechanics
Equations of state